Callard and Bowser, LLC Inc. is a Chicago, Illinois-based subsidiary of Wm. Wrigley Jr. Company responsible for Altoids mints, and other confections. Since the mints became prominent in the mid-1990s, Callard and Bowser has added a number of products under the Altoids name.

The company's best known product is its traditional mints, available in peppermint, wintergreen, cinnamon, and spearmint flavors. They are packed in a distinctive rectangular tin box.

Callard and Bowser formerly marketed a popular line of English toffees, which was discontinued between 2001 and 2003.

The company was founded by two Scottish brothers, Richard Callard and John Bowser, in 1779 in Maryhill, Glasgow during the Scottish Enlightenment period.

Callard and Bowser was owned by Arthur Guinness & Sons from 1953 to 1982 when it was acquired by the American conglomerate Beatrice Foods. In 1988 it was purchased by United Biscuits. In 1993 the company was sold to Kraft Foods who operated it until its 2004 acquisition by Wrigley.

References

Brand name confectionery
Wrigley Company